Barbara Hayes-Roth is an American computer scientist and psychologist whose research in artificial intelligence includes work on knowledge acquisition, automated planning and scheduling, spatial cognition, the blackboard system, adaptation, and intelligent behavior in interactive storytelling. She is a senior research scientist and lecturer in computer science at Stanford University.

Education and career
Hayes-Roth majored in psychology at Boston University, graduating magna cum laude in 1971. She went to the University of Michigan for graduate study in psychology, earning a master's degree in 1973 and completing her Ph.D. in 1974. Her dissertation,  Interactions in the Acquisition and Utilization of Structured Knowledge, was supervised by James Greeno.

She became a researcher at Bell Laboratories from 1974 to 1976, and at the RAND Corporation from 1976 to 1982, also holding a position as consulting assistant professor in psychology at the University of California, Los Angeles. She became a senior research scientist and lecturer at Stanford in 1982.

Selected publications

Recognition
Hayes-Roth was named a Fellow of the Association for the Advancement of Artificial Intelligence in 1991.

References

Year of birth missing (living people)
Living people
American computer scientists
21st-century American psychologists
American women computer scientists
American women psychologists
Boston University alumni
University of Michigan alumni
Fellows of the Association for the Advancement of Artificial Intelligence
Place of birth missing (living people)